Henry the Human Fly is the debut solo album by former Fairport Convention guitarist Richard Thompson. It was released on the Island label in the U.K. and the Reprise label in the U.S.A. in April 1972. The album was reissued by Rykodisc in 1991.

Thompson has stated that at one point this was the worst-selling album in the Warner Bros. catalog.

Production
Although Thompson's first solo album, two other ex-Fairport Convention members (Sandy Denny and Ashley Hutchings) make appearances. Linda Peters, who married Thompson shortly after the album was released, sings backup on Henry the Human Fly.

Critical reception
The Spin Alternative Record Guide called the songs "tinged with perversity and populated by oddballs," writing that it "reveals Thompson as the one Fairporter most fiercely determined to redefine folk rock at every turn."

Mojo counted Henry the Human Fly as one of the hundred greatest guitar albums ever produced.

Track listing
All songs written by Richard Thompson.
 "Roll Over Vaughn Williams" – 4:09
 "Nobody’s Wedding" – 3:13
 "The Poor Ditching Boy" – 3:01
 "Shaky Nancy" – 3:26
 "The Angels Took My Racehorse Away" – 4:01
 "Wheely Down" – 3:00
 "The New St. George" – 2:08
 "Painted Ladies" – 3:31
 "Cold Feet" – 2:26
 "Mary and Joseph" – 1:38
 "The Old Changing Way" – 3:55
 "Twisted" – 1:58

Personnel
Richard Thompson – guitar, vocals, accordion (1), tin whistle (4), mandolin (12)
Timi Donald – drums, vocals
Pat Donaldson  – bass guitar, vocals
David Snell  – harp (11,12)
Jeff Cole  – trombone (7,10)
John Defereri  – tenor saxophone (7,10)
Clay Toyani  – trumpet (7,10)
Sue Draheim  – fiddle (2,7)
Barry Dransfield  – fiddle (3,5,6)
John Kirkpatrick  – accordion (2,5)
Andy Roberts  – Appalachian dulcimer (3)
Sandy Denny  – piano (8), vocals (4,5)
Linda Peters  – vocals (4,5)
Ashley Hutchings  – vocals
uncredited - harmonium (6,9,10), piano (6)

References

1972 debut albums
Richard Thompson (musician) albums
Albums produced by John Wood (record producer)
Hannibal Records albums